Margit Bernhardt (born 1897) was a German figure skater. She competed at the 1928 Winter Olympics.

References

1897 births
Figure skaters at the 1928 Winter Olympics
Olympic figure skaters of Germany
German female single skaters
Year of death missing